Børsum may refer to:

 Bente Børsum (born 1934), Norwegian actress
 Lise Børsum (1908–1985), Norwegian resistance member during World War II